The Isaac Lightner House in Shaler Township, Allegheny County, Pennsylvania, was built in 1833.  This Greek Revival house was added to the National Register of Historic Places on April 20, 1978, and the List of Pittsburgh History and Landmarks Foundation Historic Landmarks in 1976.

References

Houses on the National Register of Historic Places in Pennsylvania
Houses in Allegheny County, Pennsylvania
Houses completed in 1833
Greek Revival houses in Pennsylvania
Pittsburgh History & Landmarks Foundation Historic Landmarks
National Register of Historic Places in Allegheny County, Pennsylvania